Niort Rugby Club (formerly known as Stade Niortais Rugby) is a rugby team based in the city of Niort (population approx. 70,000) in the Deux-Sèvres département in the Nouvelle-Aquitaine region. They play their home games at "Stade Espinassou" which has a seating capacity of 1,500.
Stade Niortais currently play in the Fédérale D1 division in France.

Facilities 
Stade Niortais has excellent facilities considering the size of the club. Their home ground comprises 3 pitches (2 training, 1 main pitch), over 12 dressing rooms all equipped with showers, a club house and bar used for functions and ceremonies alongside a running track, 2 tennis courts and handball court.

Emblematic Players 
 Yassine Ben Lahoucine
 Raphaël Lavaud
 Laurent Martine
 Denis Avril
 Robert Mohr

External links 
  (French)

Niort
Sport in Deux-Sèvres